Trillium crassifolium is a species of flowering plant in the bunchflower family Melanthiaceae. It is endemic to the Wenatchee Mountains in the U.S. state of Washington.

Description
Trillium crassifolium is similar to Trillium ovatum, differing from that species by having erect rhizomes, shorter petals, and thickish ovate (not rhombic) leaves.

Taxonomy
Trillium crassifolium was described by Charles Vancouver Piper in 1899. At the time, some authorities considered it to be a synonym for Trillium ovatum . More recently, T. crassifolium has been shown to be a distinct species based on molecular work.

References

External links
 

crassifolium
Flora of the Western United States
Plants described in 1899
Taxa named by Charles Vancouver Piper
Endemic flora of Washington (state)